This article presents the discography of American country music artist, Jody Miller. While signed to Capitol Records and Epic Records, Miller released 24 studio albums between 1963 and 2023. With 27 singles charting on the Billboard Hot Country Singles chart.

Albums

Studio albums

60s

70s

80s

90s

2000s

Compilations

Singles

1960s

1970s

References

Country music discographies
 
Discographies of American artists